Rahewin was an important German chronicler at the abbey of Freising in Bavaria. He was secretary and chaplain to Otto von Freising; he also continued the work of his master Otto von Freising, Gesta Friderici, books 3 and 4, between 1157 and 1160. Rahewin was also a poet. His style makes use of the cursus tardus in which the stress falls on the third and sixth syllables from the end. He died between 1170 and 1177.

References

Sources 

 .

German chroniclers
German male non-fiction writers
1170s deaths
Year of birth unknown